The J.A.M. Awards, founded in 2007, are the first socially responsible awards created within the hip-hop community.  The awards are inspired by Jam Master Jay's efforts to promote social Justice, Arts and Music ("J.A.M.") in his local community and around the world. The J.A.M. Awards select three honorees from the hip-hop community, one in the field of social Justice, one in the arts, and another in Music.  Candidates are selected based upon the impact they have made in their respective category and their record of helping others.  The J.A.M. Awards were created by David Clark, founder and CEO of David Clark Cause, and graffiti artist Kaves.

Awards Shows

2007 J.A.M. Awards
Hosted by Terri Corley-Mizell, the wife of the late Jam Master Jay, along with RUN DMC members DMC and Rev Run, the inaugural J.A.M. Awards honored Chuck D in the category of social Justice, Lee Quinones in the Arts, and Wyclef Jean in Music.  The J.A.M. Awards featured performances and introductions by DMC, Rev Run, Snoop Dogg, Raekwon, M.O.P., Jim Jones, Papoose, Everlast featuring DJ Muggs, Kid Capri, De La Soul, Mobb Deep, Dead Prez, EPMD, LL Cool J, Biz Markie, and Marley Marl.  The concert was held at New York City's Hammerstein Ballroom on November 29, 2007 and was produced by EPOP International and Empire Entertainment.  The concert was also filmed and shown as a Current TV broadcast special.

References

External links
https://archive.today/20130210032200/http://upcoming.yahoo.com/event/316394/
http://www.billboard.com/articles/news/1047173/snoop-dogg-epmd-bolster-jam-awards
http://www.nydailynews.com/entertainment/music/galleries/jam_awards_show/jam_awards_show.html
http://www.billboard.com/articles/news/1049305/jam-awards-to-highlight-positive-side-of-hip-hop

American music awards